Arctia cupido is a moth in the family Erebidae. It was described by Yasunori Kishida in 1995. It is found in Nepal.

The species of the genus Preparctia, including this one, were moved to Arctia as a result of phylogenetic research published by Rönkä et al. in 2016.

References

Moths described in 1995
Arctiini